Spain competed at the 2018 Mediterranean Games in Tarragona, Spain over 10 days from 22 June to 1 July 2018.

Medal summary

Medal table

Archery 

Men

Women

Athletics 

Men
Track & road events

Field events

Women
Track & road events

Field events

Badminton 

Men

Women

Basketball 3X3

Men's tournament

Women's tournament

Beach volleyball

Boules  

Lyonnaise

Pétanque

Boxing

Canoeing 

Men

Women

Legend: FA = Qualify to final (medal); FB = Qualify to final B (non-medal)

Cycling 

Men

Women

Equestrian

Jumping

Fencing 

Men

Women

Football 

Team

Pascu
José Lara
Carlos Beitia
Nacho Díaz
Juan Cruz
Álvaro Fernández Calvo
Álvaro García Segovia
Hugo Guillamón
Sergio Gómez

Víctor Gómez
Roberto López
Juan Miranda
Mateu Morey
Aitor Paredes
Abel Ruiz
Mujaid Sadick
Oihan Sancet
Arnau Tenas

Golf

Gymnastics

Artistic 

Men
Team

Individual

Apparatus

Women
Team

Individual

Apparatus

Rhythmic

Handball 

Men's tournament

Adriá Figueras
Aitor Ariño
Aleix Gómez
Alejandro Costoya
Ángel Fernández
Ángel Montoro
Antonio Bazán
Arnau García

Daniel Dujshebaev
Ignacio Biosca
Imanol Garciandía
Iñaki Pecina
Iosu Goñi
Kauldi Odriozola
Marc Cañellas
Sergey Hernández

Women's tournament

Ainhoa Hernández
Alicia Fernández
Almudena Rodríguez
Amaia González de Garibay
Andrea De la Torre
Carmen Campos
Emma Boada
Ivet Musons

Jennifer Gutiérrez
Judith Sans
Lara González
Maitane Etxeberria
María Prieto O'Mullony
Mercedes Castellanos
Paula García
Paula Valdivia

Judo 

Men

Women

Karate 

Men

Women

Rowing 

Men

Women

Sailing 

Men

Women

Shooting 

Men

Women

Swimming 

Men

Women

Table tennis 

Men

Women

Taekwondo 

Men

Women

Tennis 

Men

Women

Triathlon

Volleyball

Waterpolo

Water skiing

Weightlifting 

Men

Women

Wrestling

Men's Freestyle

Men's Greco-Roman

Women's Freestyle

References

Nations at the 2018 Mediterranean Games
2018
Mediterranean Games